Jean Petit (born 25 September 1949 in Toulouse, Haute-Garonne) is a former football midfielder from France, who earned twelve international caps (one goal) for the France national team during the late 1970s. Petit played much of his professional career for AS Monaco, with whom he won the French title in 1978. He was a member of the France team in the 1978 FIFA World Cup.

Playing career
1958-1967 : Toulouse FC
1967-1969 : Luchon
1969-1982 : AS Monaco

External links
Profile at France Football Federation

1949 births
Living people
French footballers
Association football midfielders
France international footballers
AS Monaco FC players
Ligue 1 players
1978 FIFA World Cup players
Footballers from Toulouse
French football managers
AS Monaco FC managers
Ligue 1 managers
AS Monaco FC non-playing staff